The following is a timeline of the history of the city of Florence, Tuscany, Italy.

The earliest timeline of Florence, the Annales florentini, was created in the 12th century.

Prior to 14th century

 59 BCE – Roman colony founded (approximate date).
 1st century CE – Catholic Diocese of Florence established.
 285 – Florence becomes seat of Tuscia region.
 405 – Siege of Florence (405).
 541 – Florence sacked by forces of Ostrogoth Totila.
 1078 – City walls built.
 1080 – Stone Ponte Vecchio (bridge) built.
 1107 – Monte Orlandi and Prato become part of Florence.
 1115–16 – Commune form of government adopted; Republic of Florence established.
 1128 – Florence Baptistery built.
 1138 – "City divided into six wards."
 1182 – Arte di Calimala (cloth guild) first mentioned (approximate date).
 1201 – Bankers' guild active (approximate date).
 1222 – Monte comune (pawnshop) opens.
 1230 –  allegedly occurs.
 1237 – Ponte alle Grazie (bridge) built.
 1244 – Venerabile Arciconfraternita della Misericordia di Firenze founded.
 1251 – First Capitano del popolo elected.
 1252
 Mint established; Florin (Italian coin) introduced.
 Santa Trinita bridge built.
 1258 – Bargello built.
 1261 – Public prison established.
 1267 – Charles of Anjou in power.
 1269 – Flood.
 1282 – "Florence adopts a new system of government by members of a guild."
 1284 – Tertio Cerchio (wall) built.
 1285 – Hospital of Santa Maria Nuova founded.
 1289
 Slavery abolished.
 Fire.
 1299 – Palazzo Vecchio construction begins.

14th–16th centuries
 1312 – Siege of Florence (1312)
 1321 – University of Florence founded.
 1333 – November: Flood.(it)
 1345 – Ponte Vecchio rebuilt.
 1348 – Black Death plague.
 1353 – Public clock installed in Palazzo Vecchio tower.
 1355 –  (church) built.
 1360 – Cathedral Campanile built.
 1377 – Medici in power.
 1382 – Loggia dei Lanzi built.
 1385 – Basilica of Santa Croce built.
 1397 – Medici Bank established.
 1415 – Bruni's History of Florence issued.
 1427 – Catasto tax begins.
 1432 – Ufficiali di Notte tribunal begins.
 1434 – Cosimo de' Medici in power.
 1436 – Duomo consecrated.
 1469 – Lorenzo de' Medici assumes power
 1471 – Printing press in operation.
 1478 – Pazzi conspiracy foiled.
 1487 – Medici giraffe arrives.
 1488 – Ancient Greek poet Homer first published in print.
 1490 – Palazzo Cocchi-Serristori built.
 1492 – Lorenzo the Magnificent dies and is succeeded by Piero the Unfortunate
 1494
 Charles VIII of France invades Italy
 Piero II acquiesces to Charles VIII and is forced to flee Florence
 Republic of Florence restored, ruled nominally by Girolamo Savonarola 
 1494 – Salone dei Cinquecento built.
 1497 – 7 February: Bonfire of the Vanities.
 1498
 Niccolò Machiavelli becomes secretary.
 23 May: Savonarola executed.
 1504 – Michelangelo's David sculpture installed in the Piazza della Signoria.
 1509 – Militia established.
 1512
 Florentine Republic dissolved after defeat by Papal forces under Medici control.
 Piero Soderini and Niccolò Machiavelli exiled.
 1513
 Giulio de Medici becomes Archbishop of Florence.
 Machiavelli publishes The Prince
 1517 – Machiavelli publishes Discourses on Livy
 1527 – 21 June: Machiavelli dies
 1529 – 24 October: Siege of Florence (1529–30) begins.
 1532 – Alessandro de Medici becomes duke of the Florentine Republic.
 1536 – Charles V visits city.
 1537 – Villani's Nuova Cronica published.
 1545 – Orto Botanico di Firenze established.
 1557 – September: Flood.(it)
 1559 – Palazzo Uguccioni built.
 1562 – Accademia del Disegno established.
 1564 – Vasari Corridor built.
 1565 – Fountain of Neptune inaugurated.
 1569 – Ponte Santa Trinita (bridge) rebuilt.
 1574 – Florentine Camerata active.
 1580 – Rules of Calcio Fiorentino sport published.
 1581 – Uffizi art museum built.
 1582 – State Archives of Tuscany established.
 1592 – Theorbo musical instrument invented.
 1598 – Premiere of Peri's opera Dafne.
 1600
 5 October: .
 Biblioteca Riccardiana founded (approximate date).
 Premiere of Peri's opera Euridice.

17th–19th centuries

 1625 – Premiere of Francesca Caccini's opera La liberazione di Ruggiero.
 1656 – Teatro della Pergola built.
 1700 – Fortepiano musical instrument prototyped.
 1739 – Academia Botanica established.
 1740 – Teatro di Santa Maria built.
 1753 – Accademia dei Georgofili established.
 1775 – Museo di Storia Naturale di Firenze established.
 1784 – Galleria dell'Accademia established.
 1799 – French occupation begins.
 1814
 French occupation ends.
 Jewish ghetto abolished.
 1817 – Teatro Goldoni opens.
 1828 – Teatro Alfieri opens.
 1844 – 3 November: .
 1847 – Premiere of Verdi's opera Macbeth.
 1848
 Prato-Florence railway begins operating.
 Firenze Santa Maria Novella railway station opens.
 1852 – Archivio di Stato di Firenze (state archives) established.
 1859 – La Nazione newspaper begins publication.
 1861
 National Library active.
 Population: 150,864.
 1862 – Politeama Fiorentino Vittorio Emanuele amphitheatre opens.
 1864 – Florence becomes part of Italy.
 1865 – Italian capital relocated to Florence from Turin.
 1867 – Società Geografica Italiana headquartered in Florence.
 1871
 Palazzo delle Assicurazioni Generali built.
 Population: 167,093.
 1879 – Horse-drawn tram begins operating.
 1882 – Great Synagogue of Florence built.
 1891 – Cathedral Museum opens.
 1896 – Firenze Campo di Marte railway station opens.
 1897
 Leo S. Olschki Editore in business.
 Population: 209,540.

20th century

 1901 – Population: 236,635.
 1904 – Giardino Tropicale established.
 1908 – La Voce magazine begins publication.
 1922 – Cinema Teatro Savoia opens.
 1925 –  newspaper begins publication.
 1926 –  (church) built.
 1931 – Population: 304,160.
 1933 – Maggio Musicale Fiorentino begins.
 1934 – Bologna–Florence railway begins operating.
 1936 – Cinema Vittoria built.
 1943
 German occupation begins.
 25 September: Aerial bombing by Allied forces.
 1944
 3 August: Bridges bombed by German forces.
 11 August: German occupation ends.
 1948 – Ponte alla Carraia (bridge) rebuilt.
 1954 – 27 October: 
 1957 – Ponte Amerigo Vespucci (bridge) built.
 1959 – Giardino dell'Iris (garden) established.
 1961 – Population: 436,516.
 1966 – 4 November: 1966 Flood of the Arno River.
 1968 –  (hospital) built.
 1977 – Florence–Rome high-speed railway begins operating.
 1978 – Indiano Bridge built.
 1982 – Historic Centre of Florence designated an UNESCO World Heritage Site.
 1986 – Gran Caffè Doney closes.
 1991 – Population: 403,294.
 1993 – 27 May: Via dei Georgofili bombing.
 1995 – European Rapid Operational Force headquartered in Florence.
 1997 – City website online (approximate date).

21st century

 2001 – Population: 356,118.
 2002 – November: European Social Forum held in city.
 2009
 Bologna–Florence high-speed railway begins operating.
 Matteo Renzi becomes mayor.
 2011 – 13 December: 2011 Florence shootings.
 2013 – Population: 366,039 city; 987,354 province.
 2014 – Dario Nardella becomes mayor.
 2015 – City becomes capital of the newly created Metropolitan City of Florence.

See also
 History of Florence
 List of mayors of Florence

Other cities in the macroregion of Central Italy:(it)
 Timeline of Ancona, Marche region
 Timeline of Arezzo, Tuscany region
 Timeline of Livorno, Tuscany 
 Timeline of Lucca, Tuscany
 Timeline of Perugia, Umbria region
 Timeline of Pisa, Tuscany
 Timeline of Pistoia, Tuscany
 Timeline of Prato, Tuscany
 Timeline of Rome, Lazio region
 Timeline of Siena, Tuscany

References

This article incorporates information from the Italian Wikipedia.

Bibliography

  (1977 reprint)

External links

  (Includes chronologies)

 
Florence